The Bristol Taxiplane and Bristol Primary Trainer were British single-engine biplane light aircraft built by the Bristol Aeroplane Company in the early 1920s. A total of 28 were built, being mainly used as trainers.

Design and development
In 1922, the Bristol Aeroplane Company developed a pair of related light aircraft designs, powered by the Bristol Lucifer three-cylinder radial engine, the Type 73 Taxiplane, a three-seat light utility aircraft and tourer, and the Type 83 Primary Trainer, a two-seat trainer intended for use for primary training at Reserve Flying Schools.

The Taxiplane was constructed of wood with fabric covering, and was fitted with single-bay biplane wings. It carried two passengers side by side in a cockpit behind the pilot. The first Taxiplane, registered G-EBEW, flew on 13 February 1923, but could be certificated only as a two-seater, being overweight with two passengers and a pilot. Only two more Taxiplanes were built.
 
The Primary Trainer, also known as the Bristol Lucifer used the same wings, tail and undercarriage as the Taxiplane, but with a new, narrower fuselage containing two tandem cockpits. The Primary Trainer showed better performance owing to its slimmer fuselage and lower weight, and was more successful, 24 being built.

A further aircraft, the Bristol Type 83E, was built as a testbed for development of the five-cylinder Bristol Titan radial engine.

Operational history
The first six Primary Trainers entered service with the Reserve Flying School at Filton in July 1923, continuing in service until December 1931, when they were replaced by de Havilland Moths. One of the surviving aircraft was modified as a three-seater and was used for sightseeing. It was scrapped in December 1933.

The remainder of the Type 83s were produced for export, with twelve being sold to Chile, five to Hungary and one to Bulgaria, all in 1926.

Variants
Type 73 Taxiplane
Three-seat light aircraft. Powered by 100 hp (80 kW) Bristol Lucifer engine, three built.

Type 83 Primary Trainer
Two-seat tandem trainer, 24 built.

Type 83E
Testbed for 250 hp (190 kW) Bristol Titan engine, one built.

Operators

Bulgarian Air Force received one aircraft.

Chilean Air Force received 12 aircraft.

Hungarian Air Force received five aircraft.

 Filton Reserve Flying School

Specifications (Type 83)

References

Citations

Bibliography

External links
 Bristol Primary Trainer –  British Aircraft Directory

1920s British civil utility aircraft
Primary Trainer
Biplanes
Single-engined tractor aircraft
Aircraft first flown in 1923